Cryptophagus is a genus of beetles in the family Cryptophagidae, the silken fungus beetles. It is distributed across all the biogeographic realms of the world. Like most of the other beetles in the family, these are fungivores, feeding on fungal spores and hyphae.

These beetles are flattened and oval in shape, and are generally 2 to 3 millimeters long. They are reddish to dark brown, sometimes with yellowish patterns on the elytra. The thorax is often sculptured with teeth, angles, or other projections. Some are hairy. The larva is usually yellow-brown and cylindrical but flattened, with visible legs.

Some species are considered pests when they inhabit stores of grain, flour, bread, dried fruit, and other products, however, the beetles feed on fungi growing on the food product rather than the product itself. They also breed in the fungi, laying eggs in the hyphae. They are more common in products that are damp and moldy. The beetles can transmit fungal spores to products, encouraging mold growth. In Canada the beetles are common in the grain-producing prairie regions.

These beetles can be found in other habitats where fungi are available, such as beehives, the nests of other hymenopterans such as wasps and ants, rodent nests, and wool.

Species include:

Cryptophagus acutangulus – acute-angled fungus beetle 
Cryptophagus bidentatus 
Cryptophagus cellaris – cellar fungus beetle
Cryptophagus confertus
Cryptophagus corticinus
Cryptophagus croceus
Cryptophagus dentatus 
Cryptophagus difficilis 
Cryptophagus discedens
Cryptophagus distinguendus
Cryptophagus fallax
Cryptophagus fumidulus
Cryptophagus hebes
Cryptophagus hexagonalis
Cryptophagus histricus
Cryptophagus jakowlewi
Cryptophagus lapponicus
Cryptophagus latens
Cryptophagus laticollis
Cryptophagus lecontei
Cryptophagus lycoperdi
Cryptophagus mainensis
Cryptophagus maximus
Cryptophagus nobilis
Cryptophagus obsoletus
Cryptophagus peregrinus
Cryptophagus pilosus 
Cryptophagus plenus
Cryptophagus politus
Cryptophagus porrectus
Cryptophagus quadrihamatus
Cryptophagus saginatus
Cryptophagus scanicus 
Cryptophagus scutellatus
Cryptophagus setulosus
Cryptophagus stromus
Cryptophagus subfumatus
Cryptophagus tuberculosus
Cryptophagus valens
Cryptophagus varus – sigmoid fungus beetle 
Cryptophagus vestigialis

Some fossil species have been discovered in amber and as compression fossils in rock:
Cryptophagus alexagrestis
Cryptophagus bassleri
Cryptophagus harenus
Cryptophagus petricola
Cryptophagus suncholensis

References

Cryptophagidae
Cucujoidea genera